Jamell Orlando Ramos Hernández (born 12 October 1981) is a Colombian footballer, normally playing as a right back. He currently plays for Junior in Colombia.

External links
 BDFA profile

1981 births
Living people
Sportspeople from Barranquilla
Colombian footballers
Deportivo Cali footballers
Atlético Junior footballers
Independiente Medellín footballers
Independiente Santa Fe footballers
Deportivo Pasto footballers
Cúcuta Deportivo footballers
Club Olimpia footballers
Once Caldas footballers
Colombian expatriate footballers
Expatriate footballers in Paraguay
Association football defenders